Debe Terhar is a US politician and member of the Republican Party.  She currently serves as president of the Ohio State Board of Education.

Biography

Early life
Debe Terhar was born in Honolulu, Hawaii and has resided in California, Pennsylvania, New York, Massachusetts, Maryland, and England before moving to Ohio in 1989.  She is a former Montessori teacher with experience in Early Childhood Montessori Education.  Terhar served on the Cincinnati Montessori Society Board of Directors and on the Parent's Advisory Council of the Kelly O'Leary Center for Autism at Cincinnati Children's Hospital.

Personal
Terhar is a summa cum laude graduate of Xavier University and currently serves as a board member on the Women of Excellence Council of Xavier's President's Advisory Council.  She is a founding member of the American Spirit Education Alliance, a nonprofit organization dedicated to the preservation of American heritage.

She is a past president of the Hamilton County Republican Women's Club, a member of the Warren County Republican Women's Club, the Hamilton County Republican Club, The Green Township Republican Club and an early participant in the Tea Party movement.  She is active in both the Northwest and Southwest Tea Parties of Hamilton County and the Lebanon Tea Party in Warren County.

Marriage and children
Terhar is married to Louis Terhar, a member of the Ohio House of Representatives from the 30th district.  They reside in the Cincinnati suburb of Monfort Heights. They have four children and four grandchildren.

Ohio State Board of Education
Terhar was elected to the Ohio State Board of Education in November 2010.  Her term continues until December 2014.  She was elected president of the state board in March 2011 with the support of Gov. John Kasich and reelected to the post in January 2013.

Philosophical and/or political views
Terhar is active in the Tea Party movement.

Hitler controversy
In January 2013, shortly after President Obama addressed the nation about gun control in the wake of the Sandy Hook Elementary School shooting, Terhar posted a graphic on her Facebook page with the caption "Never forget what this tyrant said: 'To conquer a nation, first disarm its citizens.' — Adolf Hitler."  Terhar denied that she was comparing Obama to Hitler, but later stated that we "need to step back and think about it and look at history" to see that tyrants have disarmed their citizens.

Book banning controversy
On September 10, 2013, Terhar made a statement at a State Board of Education meeting regarding the Toni Morrison novel The Bluest Eye, calling it "pornography".  The book is on a suggested reading list for the Common Core State Standards Initiative.  “I don’t want my grandchildren reading it and I don’t want anybody else’s grandchildren reading it,” she said. "It should not be used in any school for any Ohio K-12 child. If you want to use it in college somewhere, that’s fine."  Terhar later stated that she supports Common Core in Ohio, and that she was not suggesting that the state ban the book. Many local and national media reported it as a book banning case, however.

References

Ohio Republicans
Politicians from Honolulu
Tea Party movement activists
Xavier University alumni
Living people
People from Hamilton County, Ohio
Activists from Ohio
Year of birth missing (living people)